Edward De Lacy Evans (born Ellen Tremayne or Tremaye, 1830? – 25 August 1901) was a servant, blacksmith and gold miner, who immigrated from Ireland to Australia in 1856, and made international news in 1879 when it was revealed he was assigned female at birth.

Early life and name
Mystery surrounds Evans' early life and his choice of name. He told miners he worked with in Australia that he was born in France, had stolen £500 as a boy and fled to Waterford,  where he acquired his Irish accent. A woman living near Corop, who claimed to be a former Kilkenny neighbour, said he was the well-born 'Ellen Lacy' who had an illegitimate child, fled to America, but returned in the early 1850s as 'Mrs De Lacy Evans' to ride her horse through a gathering called by John Ponsonby, 5th Earl of Bessborough before being 'dragged off her pony' and forced to 'clear out'. Evans' third wife, Julia Marquand, said the name was a family one and his uncle was the British General George de Lacy Evans.

After his hospitalisation, Evans said little about his past, and was described as 'not disposed to be communicative' and someone who 'observes unusual taciturnity.'. Asked why he had 'impersonated a man', he replied 'Oh, it doesn't matter, and the sooner they put me out of the way and get done with me the better.'

Immigration to Victoria
In 1856, Evans arrived in Victoria, Australia, then in a goldrush 'boom' period, aboard the Ocean Monarch as part of the 'assisted immigration scheme' which aimed to provide the workers and residents needed in the growing colony. Evans traveled under the name Ellen Tremayne and, in the information he provided, stated that he was aged 26, born in Kilkenny, was a Roman Catholic, a housemaid and could read and write.

For most of the voyage to Australia, Evans wore the same outfit of 'a green merino dress and sealskin coat reaching almost to her ankles' with men's shirt and trousers, and was said to have a traveling trunk full of male attire, stamped with the name 'Edward De Lacy Evans'. This, and the fact he appeared to have 'formed sexual attachments' with some of the women he shared a cabin with, led to on-board speculation he was a man impersonating a woman. One of these women was later identified as Rose Kelly who was said to have been taken ill and, as a result, departed at Rio de Janeiro en route, while another was said to have been a Mary Montague. Further speculation, from among his fellow passengers, was that the 'real' Edward De Lacy Evans had enticed 'Ellen Tremayne' to take passage with him on the ship by sending his trunk ahead but he then abandoned 'her'. A later theory, not publicly mentioned during the voyage or late 19th century newspaper reports, was that the clothes belonged to Evans, and he had been wearing them prior to his immigration, but decided to make the long sea voyage – either through fear of disclosure among men, or preferring the company of women – in a female guise.

As a condition of his assisted passage Evans, under the name Ellen Tremayne, had been indentured as a maidservant to McKeddie, a Melton hotelkeeper, at a wage of 25 shillings per week, but he soon left the position and found one of his fellow passengers from the Ocean Monarch, Mary Delahunty. Delahunty was a 34-year-old governess from Harristown, Waterford, in a similar area of Ireland to Evans, and another of the 'close attachments' he had made on the voyage. Mrs. Thompson, a passenger on the Ocean Monarch, later said that Evans and Delahunty were from the same village in Kilkenny and that Delahunty was in possession of £900. She also recalled Evans saying he would marry Delahunty 'as soon as the ship reached Melbourne' and, with Evans wearing male clothes, and calling himself 'Edmund De Lacy', the Roman Catholic ceremony took place at St Francis' Church.

Little is known of Evans and Delahunty's married life over the next few years but there were reports that they 'did not live comfortably together'. Evans moved to work as a miner at Blackwood, in the state's north-west, not far from Melton where he'd been employed as 'Ellen Tremayne', and Delahunty followed him in 1858. Delahunty established a school in Blackwood but in 1862 left to marry Lyman Oatman Hart, an American mining surveyor. Delahunty told 'all who objected to this blatant act of bigamy' that her first marriage was not legal as Evans was a woman. Delahunty and Hart moved to Daylesford where they lived through the 1860s and 1870s.

Sandhurst
Evans also left Blackwood in 1862, moving to the central Victorian city of 'Sandhurst' (now known as Bendigo), and, describing himself as a widower, he married a 23-year-old Irishwoman, Sarah Moore. Over the next five years he held various occupations including carter, miner, blacksmith and ploughman and lived with Moore in several nearby towns. He also owned shares in a number of gold mines and paid property rates in Sandhurst and the adjoining district of Eaglehawk. When he was found in a servant's bedroom at a local hotel he was jailed for trespass for seven days.

In 1867, Moore died of pulmonary tuberculosis and the following year Evans met, and married, a friend of his former wife's sister, 25-year-old Julia Marquand. Marquand was a French dressmaker's assistant who lived with her sister and brother-in-law, the prominent Sandhurst businessman, and owner of the 'City Family Hotel', Jean Baptiste Loridan.

In the early years of their marriage Evans and Marquand often lived apart but the couple reconciled by 1872. Evans progressed in his mining profession and their Sandhurst home was a cottage that he had built. A formal studio portrait taken at this time may be significant in its representation of how they saw themselves and their 'establishment of a stable and traditional family unit'.

In 1877, Marquand gave birth to a daughter the couple called 'Julia Mary'. Evans later supported Marquand when she brought a child maintenance suit against her brother-in-law Jean Baptiste Loridan for the child but he gave his name as father on the birth certificate. Around this period Evans' was injured at work and, while he 'welcomed the child as his own' he was also 'deeply disturbed by the circumstances in which his wife became pregnant'.

On 21 July 1879, Loridan took him to the Bendigo Hospital as he was 'dangerous to others', but, when told to take a bath, he refused and escaped. The following day he was arrested at home and brought to the Police Court where the magistrates agreed with the medical assessment that Evans was suffering from 'softening of the brain' and ordered him to be involuntarily committed to 'the lunatic wards' of the Bendigo hospital.

'A curious incident has occurred'
For six weeks at the Bendigo Hospital Evans refused to take a bath. He shared a room with a warder called Gundry to whom he said that 'his parents were Irish, but that he had come from France when about seven or eight years of age'. However, when Gundry used some French phrases, Evans claimed that he'd 'forgotten the language'. While there he had regular visits from his wife and daughter, as well as other relatives, one of whom called Evans 'Uncle', while Julia Mary called him 'Dadds'.

On 30 August 1879, the hospital decided to send Evans and another patient to the Kew Asylum near Melbourne, accompanied by a police constable. Marquand was at the station and Evans told her to take care of Julia Mary and 'both he and his wife were weeping' by the time they left.

The events at the Kew Asylum were described in The Argus on 3 September 1879:
"A curious incident has occurred at Kew Lunatic Asylum. A lunatic was brought from Sandhurst by the police, and was admitted into one of the male wards. The patient was tolerably quiet until preparations were made for giving 'him' the usual bath. On the attendants attempting to carry out the programme, violent resistance was made, the reason for which proved to be that the supposed man was in reality a woman. The most singular part of the affair is that the woman had been received into Sandhurst Hospital as a male patient and sent thence to the asylum under the name of Evans. She states that she has lived at Sandhurst for many years dressed in male attire. Her age is about 35."

On 4 September 1879, the Bendigo Advertiser ran with the headline 'Extraordinary Case Of Concealment Of Sex' and wrote:
"One of the most unparalleled impostures has been brought to light during the past few days, which it has ever been the province of the press of these colonies to chronicle, and we might even add is unprecedented in the annals of the whole world. A woman, under the name of Edward De Lacy Evans, has for 20 years passed for a man in various parts of the colony of Victoria... As it is almost impossible to give an account of the case without making use of the masculine pronoun when referring to Evans, we propose to use that appellation... "

It was soon reported by local newspapers, and then the 'colonial and international press', that Evans had been determined by the Kew Asylum to be a woman, and 'promptly handed over to female nurses' and sent back in Bendigo. Evans later recalled:
"The fellers there took hold o' me to give me a bath, an' they stripped me to put me in the water, an' then they saw the mistake. One feller ran off as if he was frightened; the others looked thunderstruck an' couldn't speak. I was handed over to the women, and they dressed me up in frocks and petticoats."

While still a patient at Bendigo, Evans said he knew who the father of his child was, made a reference to his wife not being 'true', and mentioned concerns about financial difficulties and possibly losing the house he had built, before adding, 'Everything coming together was enough to drive a man mad.' Marquand also spoke to the press and insisted she had never known Evans was not a man.

It wasn't only the newspapers that covered the 'curious incident'; Stawell photographer Aaron Flegeltaub began selling copies of the formal portrait Marquand and Evans had taken in the early 1870s, while Sandhurst photographer N. White managed to gain access to the Bendigo Hospital and took a number of head-shots of Evans wearing a 'white hospital nightshirt (or straight-jacket)' and looking 'wild eyed and probably affronted by the intrusion' which were used to create an image he also sold. The hospital refused requests from 'entrepreneurs' for Evans be ‘publicly exhibited'.

'Another intrusion' was a gynaecological examination conducted by a Dr Penfold, which caused Evans to 'cry and scream' when the speculum was used, and resulted in a finding that he was 'physiologically female' and 'had carried and borne a child'. Evans later said the 'examination had injured' him.

On 10 October 1879, the Bendigo Hospital declined a request by the Kew Asylum to return Evans as he 'was improving daily, and will soon be in a fit state to be discharged'. By December, Evans was declared 'cured' and released, but, a few days later, dressed in female clothes, he was 'still mentally distressed' when he gave evidence in support of Marquand's unsuccessful suit against Loridan.

Later life and legacy
In late December 1879, Evans was part of events by 'panorama showmen' Augustus Baker Pierce and William Bignell in Geelong and Stawell and newspapers noted that 'neither mind nor body possesses the vigour once so noticeable'. This was followed, in 1880, by appearances in Melbourne billed as ‘The Wonderful Male Impersonator' as part of the 'living wonders' at the Waxworks, while Sydney shows were accompanied by pamphlets about 'The Man-Woman Mystery'.

By February 1881, Evans had applied for admittance to a Benevolent Asylum and he was sent to the Melbourne Immigrants’ Home in St Kilda Road. He remained there until his death, twenty years later, on 25 August 1901.

In 1897, Joseph Furphy, who, from the late 1860s, lived near Bendigo, published his first novel Such Is Life and included the comparison to Evans with the mention; ‘one of those De Lacy Evanses we often read of in novels’.

In 2006, sites associated with Evans were included in the Australian Lesbian and Gay Archives' queer history walk held as part of Melbourne's Midsumma Festival.

References

External links
 Pamphlet sold at Sydney 'shows': The History and confession of Ellen Tremaye, alias, De Lacy Evans, the man-woman (1880)

1830 births
1901 deaths
History of Melbourne
History of Victoria (Australia)
Transgender men
Australian transgender people